Spirobolellus simplex is a species of millipede in the family Spirobolidae. The species hasn't been found since 1951, and is listed as critically endangered-possibly extinct.

References

Animals described in 1984
Spirobolida